The men's lightweight single sculls competition at the 2010 Asian Games in Guangzhou, China was held from 15 November to 19 November at the International Rowing Centre.

Schedule 
All times are China Standard Time (UTC+08:00)

Results 
Legend
DNS — Did not start

Heats 
 Qualification: 1 → Final A (FA), 2–6 → Repechage (R)

Heat 1

Heat 2

Repechages 
 Qualification: 1–2 → Final A (FA), 3–5 → Final B (FB)

Heat 1

Heat 2

Finals

Final B

Final A

References 

Results

External links 
Official Website

Rowing at the 2010 Asian Games